Brosemer Brewery, also known as the Seaway Supply Building, is a historic brewery located at Oswego in Oswego County, New York.  It was built in 1888 and is a four-story building measuring approximately 50 feet wide and 126 feet deep.  It is a heavy timber post and beam and brick masonry structure on a limestone foundation. It ceased use as a brewery in the 1920s, after which it housed manufacturing and warehousing companies.

It was listed on the National Register of Historic Places in 2010.

References

Industrial buildings and structures on the National Register of Historic Places in New York (state)
Industrial buildings completed in 1888
Buildings and structures in Oswego County, New York
Brewery buildings in the United States
National Register of Historic Places in Oswego County, New York